Raaz is a 1967 Hindi romantic thriller movie directed by Ravindra Dave. Produced by G. P. Sippy for Sippy Films, the story was written by C. J. Pavri. The film stars Rajesh Khanna, Babita, I. S. Johar and Asit Sen. The film's music is by Kalyanji Anandji. Rajesh Khanna and Babita are introduced in this film. Khanna's performance in this film was critically appreciated.

Plot
Kumar (Rajesh Khanna), though of Indian origin, lives in Africa. He has recurring dreams of a Railway Station in India called "Viran Nagar". He decides to find for himself and travels to India along with his friend, Rocky (I.S Johar). They are able to find Viran Nagar railway station, which is exactly as Kumar had dreamed of. When they go to find a ride, the locals shy away from them as behave as though they have seen a ghost. They find temporary accommodations and set out to discover the mystery behind Kumar's dreams. Then a young woman, Sapna (Babita), meets with Kumar, tells him that she has been awaiting his return, and now they can be together again. But Kumar has never been to this place before, and ends up even more confused. Then another local villager named Bansi tells them he had himself seen Kumar getting killed and buried in the nearby forest. Kumar and Rocky must now find out who was killed, and why the villagers believe that Kumar has returned from the grave.

Kumar finds out the truth from a mysterious man (Kamal Kapoor) that the man who was killed was actually Kumar's twin brother Sunil. The killer was Sapna's evil uncle Sarkar Nath (D.K. Sapru) who was against Kumar and Sapna's love and hence planned to kill Kumar. Kumar was attacked by Sarkar's henchmen and lost consciousness. At the same time, Sunil and his friend arrived in Viran Nagar and found Kumar unconscious. Sunil went to find help but was mistaken for Kumar and killed and buried in the forest. As a result of his head injury from the attack of Sarkar's men, Kumar had lost his memory. Thus he began to have the recurring dreams when he returned to Africa.

In the end Kumar identifies the villains, fights and defeats them. Kumar and Sapna live happily ever after.

Cast
 Rajesh Khanna as Kumar/Sunil (Double Role)
 Babita as Sapna
 Ratnamala as Paro, Sapna's mother
 I. S. Johar as Rocky
 D.K. Sapru as Sarkar Nath
 Laxmi Chhaya as Bela
Kamal Kapoor as Sunil's friend
 Harindranath Chattopadhyay as Baba
 Asit Sen as Bansi
 Meena T as Indu
 Rahul as Thakur Singh, stone mine supervisor
 Harbans Darshan M. Arora as Doctor
 Pandari Bai as Babita's house maid
 Narmada Shankar as Diwanji

Soundtrack

Quotes on the film
Rajesh Khanna said in an interview, "Though “Aakhri Khat” is my first film, I received my first break as a leading actor in Ravindra Dave's, “Raaz” in 1967. My heroine was Babita. Though I had lots of confidence, I was shy in facing the camera initially. In my first three shots, I had to perform with stress on my body language and dialogue delivery. Though I was right with my dialogues, my movements were not up to the mark. Ravindra Dave explained me my scenes and movements very clearly correcting my way of walking.Also it was based on double role and was a film much ahead of its time. There are two Rajesh Khanna."

References

External links 
 

1967 films
1960s Hindi-language films
Films scored by Kalyanji Anandji